The Man Whose Mind Exploded is a 2013 documentary film directed by Toby Amies. The film depicts the strange relationship between Toby and Brighton eccentric, Drako Oho Zarharzar. It was first premiered at the Sheffield Doc/Fest and pitched in the 2008 MeetMarket, and was also shown at the Cork Film Festival, Revelation Perth International Film Festival, Cambridge Film Festival, Brighton's Cinecity Festival, and was an official selection at the East End Film Festival.

The Man Whose Mind Exploded started life as a BBC Radio 4 programme described by Miranda Sawyer in The Observer as "the best documentary of 2008". The reception to it was so positive that the director was encouraged to turn it into a film. The film was produced by Rob Alexander, Kat Mansoor, and Toby Amies. Executive producers were Daisy Asquith and Dunstan Bruce while the editing was done by Jim Scott.

Synopsis 
Drako Oho Zarharzar can remember modeling for Salvador Dalí and hanging out with The Stones. But he can't remember yesterday. Following a severe head injury Drako has serious brain damage and terrible memory loss. He can access memories from before his accident, but can't imprint new ones. As he puts it, "the recording machine in my head doesn't work". As an antidote to depression he chose to live "completely in the now" according to the bizarre mottoes delivered to him whilst in his second coma. Living in a tiny flat completely filled with a collage of memories, reminders and erotic art Drako's house acts as a metaphor for his extraordinary mind.

Filmed over four years the director starts off making a film exploring Drako's lurid and exotic back story including work with Dalí, [the Factory], Les Folies Bergère, and Derek Jarman. But he is forced to stay in Drako's never ending now and soon a line is crossed, and the documentary maker becomes caretaker.

Soundtrack 
The film music was composed by Adam Peters who made his debut as a solo movie score composer on Savages (2012) directed by Oliver Stone.

Reception 
The Man Whose Mind Exploded gained 4 star reviews from The Times, The Guardian, Time Out and The Independent in the UK.

References 

 Miranda Sawyer, The Man Whose Mind Exploded, BBC Radio 4.
 4-star review, The Independent.
4-star review, The Guardian
4-star review, The Times
4-star review Time Out (Magazine)
Sheffield Doc/Fest
Revelation International Film Festival

External links
 

Documentary films about mental health
Documentary films about people with disability
2013 films
2013 documentary films
British documentary films
2010s English-language films
2010s British films